Strontium bromide is a chemical compound with a formula SrBr2. At room temperature it is a white, odourless, crystalline powder. Strontium bromide imparts a bright red colour in a flame test, showing the presence of strontium ions. It is used in flares and also has some pharmaceutical uses.

Preparation
SrBr2 can be prepared from strontium hydroxide and hydrobromic acid.
 
Alternatively strontium carbonate can also be used as strontium source.

These reactions give hexahydrate of SrBr2, which decomposes to dihydrate at 89 °C. At 180 °C anhydrous SrBr2 is obtained.

Structure
At room temperature, strontium bromide adopts a crystal structure with a tetragonal unit cell and space group P4/n. This structure is referred to as α-SrBr2 and is isostructural with EuBr2 and USe2. Around 920 K (650 °C), α-SrBr2 undergoes a first-order solid-solid phase transition to a much less ordered phase, β-SrBr2, which adopts the cubic fluorite structure. The beta phase of strontium bromide has a much higher ionic conductivity of about 1 S cm−1, comparable to that of molten SrBr2, due to extensive disorder in the bromide sublattice. Strontium bromide melts at 930 K (657 °C).

See also 

Strontium chloride

References 

 http://www.webelements.com/

Strontium compounds
Bromides
Alkaline earth metal halides